Fool is the 20th studio album by British singer-songwriter Joe Jackson. Recorded the day after the end of his Fast Forward tour at the Tonic Room Studios in Boise, Idaho. Jackson had decided to record the album in whichever city the tour finished, which happened to be Boise after a performance at the Egyptian Theatre. It was released on 18 January 2019 through Edel AG.

Track listing
All songs written, arranged and produced by Joe Jackson.

Personnel 
 Musicians 
 Joe Jackson - vocals, keyboards, programming
 Graham Maby - bass, vocals
 Teddy Kumpel - guitar, vocals
 Doug Yowell - drums, programming, vocals

 Production
 Joe Jackson and Pat Dillett - producer
 Pat Dillett - mixing
 Greg Calbi, Sterling Sound - mastering

Charts

References

2019 albums
Joe Jackson (musician) albums
Albums produced by Pat Dillett